Anna Azerli (born 17 November 1989) is a New Zealand-born Italian pop-opera singer and model.

Born in Wellington, New Zealand, Anna has Italian citizenship, and during her career she performed on well-known stages like La Scala, Metropolitan Opera, Carnegie Hall, and then signed a contract with Universal Music.

In 2014 she became popular after recording a song in Russian titled «Возьмите меня замуж, президент!» (”Marry me, Mr. President!”) addressed to Russian president Vladimir Putin.

References

External links
Anna Azerli on Facebook
Anna Azerli on Twitter
Anna Azerli on Myspace
Anna Azerli at pinterest
Anna Azerli at linkedin

1982 births
Living people
Italian pop singers
21st-century Italian women opera singers
Italian female models
New Zealand pop singers
21st-century New Zealand women opera singers
New Zealand female models
New Zealand emigrants to Italy